Mundheim is a small village in the municipality of Kvam in Vestland county, Norway.  It is located in the southern part of the municipality, along the Hardangerfjorden, just northwest of the island of Varaldsøy.  The village sits at the junction of two county roads (fylkesvei).  Fv48 runs through Mundheim from Gjermundshamn (south) to Eikelandsosen (north) and Fv49 runs northeast to Ploganes and Norheimsund.

History
Historically, Mundheim was part of the parish of Strandebarm.  When municipalities were established in Norway in 1838, Mundheim was part of Strandebarm municipality. On 1 January 1902, the new municipality of Varaldsøy was created by separating it from Strandebarm. The new municipality consisted of the whole island of Varaldsøy as well as the mainland district surrounding Mundheim (northwest and west of the island). On 1 January 1964, Varaldsøy municipality was dissolved and the Mundheim area (population: 300) was administratively transferred to the municipality of Kvam, and the rest of Varaldsøy became a part of Kvinnherad municipality.

See also
Robert Mundheim (born 1933), American attorney, law professor, and Dean of the University of Pennsylvania Law School

References 

Villages in Vestland
Kvam